Aechmea organensis is a plant species in the genus Aechmea. This species is endemic to southeastern Brazil.

Cultivars
The plant is widely cultivated as an ornamental. Cultivars include:

 Aechmea 'Chardonnay'
 Aechmea 'Christie March'
 Aechmea 'Coral Beauty'
 Aechmea 'Freckles'
 Aechmea 'Graceful'
 Aechmea 'Raymond Rocket'

References

organensis
Flora of Brazil
Plants described in 1880